Alexander Gumberg (1887–1939) born in Kropyvnytskyi (then Elizavetgrad), he was a Ukrainian of Jewish background who emigrated to the United States in 1903 and went on to become an important link between the Soviet regime and the USA following the Bolshevik seizure of power in 1917. Although he was not a Bolshevik himself, his brother Sergey Zorin was.

References

1887 births
1939 deaths
Ukrainian Jews
Emigrants from the Russian Empire to the United States
American people of Ukrainian-Jewish descent